Philautus petersi is a species of frog in the family Rhacophoridae.
It is found in Indonesia, Malaysia, Thailand, and possibly Brunei.
Its natural habitats are subtropical or tropical moist lowland forests and subtropical or tropical moist montane forests.
It is threatened by habitat loss.

References

External links
 Sound recordings of Philautus petersi at BioAcoustica

External links

Amphibian and Reptiles of Peninsular Malaysia - Philautus petersi

Petersi
Amphibians described in 1900
Amphibians of Indonesia
Amphibians of Malaysia
Amphibians of Thailand
Taxonomy articles created by Polbot